The 2015–2016 UCI Cyclo-cross World Cup events and season-long competition will take place between 16 September 2015 and 24 January 2016, organised by the Union Cycliste Internationale (UCI). With CrossVegas, this season featured the first World Cup cross outside Europe.

Defending champions are Kevin Pauwels in the men's competition and Sanne Cant in the women's competition.

Points distribution
Points are awarded to all eligible riders each race. The top ten finishers receive points according to the following table:

Riders finishing in positions 11 to 50 also receive points, going down from 40 points for place 11 by one point per place to 1 point for 50th place.

Events
In comparison to last season's six races, this season had seven. Milton Keynes was taken out of the programme – while Las Vegas and Lignières-en-Berry were added .

Individual standings

Men

Women

References

World Cup
World Cup
UCI Cyclo-cross World Cup